Our Lady of the Scapular Parish is a Roman Catholic personal parish that specifically ministers to Polish immigrants and those of Polish descent. Our Lady of the Scapular Parish was established on August 1, 2013, as a result from a merger of Our Lady of Mount Carmel Parish (1899–2013) and St. Stanislaus Kostka Parish (1914–2013). The activities of the parish are located at Our Lady of Mount Carmel Catholic Church in Wyandotte, Michigan, Wayne County, United States.

History

The history of Our Lady of Mount Carmel Church, the parish it serves today, and its surrounding neighborhood is connected with the first settlement of Poles in the area.

Origin of the Polish settlement
The city of Wyandotte is situated along the Detroit River and the old Michigan Central Railroad. Wyandotte is located about 15 miles to the south of Detroit. At the 1940 census, the population of the city was approximately 35,000 people. Of this total there were over 9,000 Poles grouped within the neighborhoods of the three Polish parishes at that time: Our Lady of Mount Carmel (1899–2013), St. Stanislaus Kostka (1914–2013), and St. Helena (1927–2007).

The Society of St. Stanislaus Kostka
The Polish settlement began with Anthony Zynger, the first Pole to come to Wyandotte. After the Austro-Prussian War of 1866, he emigrated to the United States and eventually coming to Wyandotte where he found employment in one of the many factories.

In 1868, Anthony Lesczynski emigrated to the United States and came to Wyandotte. In the course of time, he opened a grocery store at the intersection of Oak and 4th Streets in Wyandotte. On November 22, 1870, a mission was preached at the grocery store by Rev. Fr. Xavier Szulak, S.J., and it was during this mission that Anthony Lesczynski established the Society of St. Stanislaus Kostka. By this time, there were several Polish families living in Wyandotte and membership soon reached 37 members. In 1872, during the dedication of St. Albertus Catholic Church in Detroit, this society was officially represented by Anthony Zynger and Anthony Lesczynski.

In 1875, hard times struck the laboring classes of Wyandotte. Living conditions soon became so intolerable that during an 1876 depression many of the first Polish families were forced to leave Wyandotte and moved to Arkansas and other western states. This depression turned out to be temporary. The 1876 depression lifted the following year. Consequently, many new Polish families began to arrive in Wyandotte. However, these new arrivals found security there only for a short time. Living conditions again became very bad and many of these new families soon left for the neighboring cities of Ecorse and Detroit. Owing to this forced emigration, the Society of St. Stanislaus Kostka could not survive and dissolved for lack of membership.

In 1888, when more members could be counted upon, the society was revived by Francis Michalak who was elected President by the 47 new members. The Board of Directors consisted of: Francis Michalak, President; Joseph Kasprzyk, Vice-President; Stephan Zalewski, Secretary; M. Ozowski, Cashier; and Martin Grabarkiewicz, Cashier Protector.

The society attended Mass regularly at the Irish church of St. Patrick's and at the German church of St. Joseph's, both in Wyandotte. Once a month, a Polish priest administered to their spiritual needs. This was rendered very often by Rev. Fr. Vitold Buchaczkowski from SS. Cyril and Methodius Polish Seminary (formerly of Detroit) in Orchard Lake, Michigan. A special feature of this service was an annual indulgence imparted to them on Easter Sunday and on the feast day of St. Stanislaus Kostka.

From 1888 to 1898, 150 Polish families emigrated to Wyandotte and settled a small village west of Wyandotte called Glenwood, Michigan. At first, they attended Mass at St. Joseph Church, but because they were discriminated against, they transferred to St. Patrick Church.

Although only partially organized, the Poles began to plan to establish a parish in which they could be ministered to in the Polish language. A committee was organized by the society to make the initial steps toward organizing and pushing the matter to its desirable conclusion with the approval by the Bishop of Detroit. They consisted of: Martin Grabarkiewicz, Thomas Biniasz, Michael Sawinski, Frank Lybik, Martin Ignasiak, and Michael Dolinski.

Our Lady of Mount Carmel Parish (1899–2013)

The first business transaction of the building committee concerned the purchase of several lots in Glenwood, Michigan, on Superior and Pulaski Boulevard (now 10th Street) from the Welch Brother's Realty Company. This deal was fulfilled, and Welch Brother's Company donated eight lots for the building of the proposed church and school. On September 8, 1899, the Most Rev. Bishop John Samuel Foley personally inspected the grounds. He approved the location and almost immediately appointed Rev. Fr. Bernard Zmijewski as pastor. Fr. Zmijewski became pastor on September 18, 1899. Since the church building was still in the planning stage, he was constrained to hold services at St. Patrick's Church.

The charter parishioners desired to name the parish "Our Lady of the Scapular," however; because Bishop Foley did not recognize this folksy title, he named the new parish "Our Lady of Mount Carmel." In effect, since the beginning, parishioners had always referred to the parish with the Polish "Szkaplerznej" or, "Scapular."

The laying of the cornerstone of a combination of church and school under the title of "Our Lady of Mount Carmel" took place on December 3, 1899, and the formal dedication of the completed structure was held on July 8, 1900. Rev. Fr. John Moneta, a professor from SS. Cyril and Methodius Polish Seminary in Detroit preached the homily. The choir from St. Josaphat's Church in Detroit, under the direction of Zygmunt Kadlubowski, added much to the solemnity of the dedication.

The church building also served as an elementary school. Fr. Zmijewski petitioned Mother Cajetan (Mother Provincial of the Felician Sisters in Detroit) an earnest appeal for the Felician Sisters to take charge of the school. The request was granted. Beginning in September, 1901, the Felician Sisters opened two classrooms in the basement to teach the first and second grades. The following year, 113 boys and girls were enrolled in the school. The sisters lived in the school for over 15 years before a convent was built.

The total building cost was $26,961.15. To cover the large cost, money was obtained from various sources: $7,063.69 from outright donations; a bank loan of $15,000 was negotiated; and $5,000 was borrowed from the pastor. Fr. Zmijewski built a rectory on Pulaski Boulevard with his personal funds and established a library of 500 Polish and English books. He also was instrumental in incorporating the Village of Glenwood into the City of Wyandotte.

In 1906, the relationship between Fr. Zmijewski and the parish committee became strained and tense until the whole matter became grave enough to be brought to the attention of Bishop Foley. Bishop Foley had no choice but to proclaim a cooling off period to dispel the heat caused by friction and ordered the parish closed and Fr. Zmijewski was removed as pastor on February 18, 1906. The parish remained closed until March 19, 1906, when Rev. Fr. Frank Sajecki, pastor of St. Albertus Parish in Detroit was sent as an administrator, but ill health forced him to leave after one week. He died a week later at age 33. Rev. Fr. Maruszczyk was appointed administrator until April 26, 1906, when Rev. Fr. Joseph Lempka, became pastor on April 27, 1906.

Fr. Lempka's pastorate was entirely taken up with the perpetual struggles of the parish debt. He built a new rectory at a cost of $5,000 because the existing rectory was the personal property of Fr. Zmijewski. The former rectory on 10th Street eventually was sold to the parish to become an infirmary for the Felician Sisters who had been stricken from a tuberculous epidemic. When the stricken sisters died, they were buried in the nearby Mount Carmel Cemetery. The 20 sisters who are buried at Mount Carmel Cemetery were only 20 to 21 years old.

In 1909, Rev. Fr. Constantine Dziuk was appointed as pastor. Fr. Dziuk perceived the necessity and advantage of enlarging the parish grounds and purchased adjacent vacant property placing a definite stamp on the parish holdings. In July 1911, Fr. Dziuk was transferred to Detroit to organize the new Assumption of the Blessed Virgin Mary Parish. He was succeeded by Rev. Fr. Alexander Grudzinski as pastor.

Fr. Grudzinki erected the present church building and the Felician Sisters convent, both in 1916. After the new church was completed, the original 1899 building was turned over for exclusive school use and additions were made. The present church is a prime example of the so-called 'Polish Cathedral style' of churches in both its opulence and grand scale.

In 1918, Fr. Grudzinki was transferred to St. Francis Xavier Parish in Detroit and the Rt. Rev. Msgr. Adalbert Zadala was appointed pastor for a year. Rev. Fr. Maximilian Gannas was appointed pastor also for a year. Fr. Gannas organized a parish Boy Scout group. Rev. Fr. Leo Jarecki was appointed pastor in October, 1920.

1920s – 1940s

On April 7, 1921, Fr. Jarecki was shot by an unknown assailant upon answering the door of the rectory. Fr. Jarecki died en route to the John F. Eilbert Memorial Hospital in Wyandotte. 5,000 people attended his Funeral Mass at Our Lady of Mount Carmel Church including 250 clergymen from across the United States. The body was escorted through the streets of Wyandotte to Mount Carmel Cemetery by a procession of hundreds of people. Fr. Jarecki installed and christened the three church bells in use. They were christened: St. Stanislaus Kostka, The Holy Angels, and Our Lady Queen of Poland. In 1921, Rev. Fr. Peter S. Kruszka was appointed as pastor.

Fr. Kruszka built an addition to the elementary school, installed a heating plant, and enlarged the convent. He opened a complete high school in 1928. In 1938, due to failing health, Fr. Kruszka went on sabbatical, and Rev. Fr. Boleslaus Parzych was appointed as administrator in June, 1938. Fr. Kruszka never regained his health and died on March 26, 1939. During Fr. Parzych's time as administrator, the interior and exterior of the elementary school building was painted, the church roof was repainted, and the interest rate of the parish debt was reduced. On June 10, 1939, Rev. Fr. Ladislaus A. Krych was appointed pastor.

When Fr. Krych became pastor, there were 520 students enrolled in the elementary school. In 1940, he organized a school band and orchestra, supplying it with the necessary instruments and band uniforms from his own personal savings. In 1941, a kindergarten class was added. The elementary school enrollment for the 1948–49 school year was 737 students. in 1942, Fr. Krych began remodeling the church. The crumbling masonry was covered with lead and the church windows were reinstalled and properly encased. New ventilation was installed and the church was rewired and reequipped with a modern lighting system. The church organ was repaired and reconstructed. In January, 1942, the interior of the church was cleaned and repainted at the cost of $9000.

The Third Order of St. Francis and the Polish Alliance bought a new communion rail. Benefactors and patrons purchased the current high altar and the Altar Society bought the current tabernacle and the flower vases. Generous individual parishioners donated a monstrance, vestments, a pulpit, confessionals, and altar linens. The altar boys worked to buy the current shrine of Our Lady of Perpetual Help. In 1943 and 1944, improvements were made to the convent, the school buildings, and the church. The exterior of the church was washed and repaired and the brick was painted in 1945. On January 15, 1946, the parish debt of $5,000 was liquidated. This was the first time the parish had no creditors. In 1947, improvements such as a new roof for the school buildings, a new boiler, an automatic system of bell ringing and amplifiers for the church were added. In 1948, the parish purchased a strip of real estate bordering Electric Street. Electric Street closed and the land would be used for parish expansion. In 1949, the parish celebrated its 50th Anniversary. For this occasion, the church was washed and refurnished at the cost of $5,180. The interior of the school was also repainted.

1950s – 1970s 
In 1950, asphalt pavement was completed between the church and the schools. In 1951, with the winning of the Catholic and Parochial City Championships in football, the parishioners built a field house for the athletes. A combination field house, consisting of a locker room, two dressing rooms, an equipment room, a utility room, and toilet facilities were built. On August 24, 1951, the cornerstone of the present rectory was blessed.

In 1951, an appeal was made by Fr. Krych for new church pews. Individual parishioners purchased pews and memorial plates were placed on each one. In July, 1953, the new pews were ordered and were installed in September, 1953. On March 17, 1956, Fr. Krych died from a heart attack. Respected by the whole community, Fr. Krych was mourned by thousands. In June, 1956, Rev. Fr. Jerome Juchniewicz was appointed pastor.

In 1960, Fr. Juchniewicz remodeled the tarnished statue of Our Lady of Mount Carmel. He removed the statue from the center of the front of the church and placed it on the side of the church. On September 13, 1963, Father Juchniewicz suffered a fatal heart attack and died at Wyandotte General Hospital. In September, 1963, Rev. Fr. Venanty Szymanski was appointed pastor.

In 1963, a financial crisis faced the Archdiocese of Detroit. Consolidation of high schools seemed to be the answer to many parishes' financial difficulties. Our Lady of Mount Carmel Parish was advised to join the parishes of St. Joseph, St. Patrick, St. Helena, St. Stanislaus Kostka, and St. Elizabeth on establishing a central high school. A public meeting of the parish was held and the parishioners overwhelmingly decided to keep Our Lady of Mount Carmel High School operating and not join the consolidation. Throughout the years, the parishioners labored to a functional school.

In 1964, Fr. Szymanski began full force in building the a new elementary school building. On October 30, 1966, the cornerstone of the new elementary school was blessed. In 1967, Fr. Szymanski suffered two strokes. Throughout his rehabilitation, the parish continued to operate through the endeavors of his assistant, Rev. Fr. Stanley Redwick. In May, 1972, Fr. Szymanski resigned. Rev. Fr. Stanley Konopka was appointed as administrator. In August, 1972, Rev. Fr. Stanley Redwick (former assistant) was appointed pastor.
Fr. Redwick saw a need for renovations in the schools and church. He remodeled the high school kitchen into a modern well-equipped facility. The rooms cannot only be used for meals but the adjoining social room can be used for society meetings. In 1972, the beginning of the parish festival was planned for the weekend before Labor Day and has continued annually.   The first festival profit of $85,000 was the result of the hard work of Fr. Redwick and hundreds of parishioners who worked to make the event a success.

In 1974, the parish celebrated its 75th anniversary. Fr. Redwick initiated plans to repaint and repair the inside and outside of the church. In addition to repainting the inside of the church, the roof needed repairs. The stained glass windows were reset along with various other remodeling.

1980s–2000s

In 1993, Fr. Redwick resigned due to failing health. Rev. Fr. Walter J. Ptak was appointed pastor.

On October 31, 2004, a monument to Pope John Paul II sculpted by Czesław Dźwigaj was dedicated by Cardinal Adam Maida in the peace garden next to the church.

St. Stanislaus Kostka Parish (1914–2013)

Schools
Our Lady of Mount Carmel Elementary School
Our Lady of Mount Carmel High School

Liturgical Celebrations

The Annual May Procession
The May Procession is held in honor of the Blessed Virgin Mary is an annual observance at Our Lady of Mount Carmel. The men's and the ladies organizations process outside, around Superior Boulevard, into the church to Mary's altar where she is crowned Queen of Heaven and Earth. Beautiful hydrangea plants and bouquets of roses are placed around the Blessed Mother's altar to display the beauty and love for her. In previous years, the service included a living rosary led by the 7th and 8th grade classes and concluded with exposition and benediction of the Blessed Sacrament.

Forty Hours' Devotion
In the observance of the annual Forty Hours' Devotion, the Blessed Sacrament is exposed for forty hours in the sanctuary beginning the Friday before Laetare Sunday. Various services held during the forty hours include private adoration, rosaries, personal devotions, and confession, all before the Blessed Sacrament exposed on the altar. The Sunday noon High Mass is followed in the evening by the closing ceremony, which includes a sermon, several hymns and prayers, a procession, and benediction of the Blessed Sacrament.

Societies

The Rosary Society
The Mt. Carmel Rosary Society was organized on October 12, 1888, at St. Patrick's Parish, Wyandotte, Michigan. In 1890, when the new church was built it was transferred and reorganized by Father Zmijewski. The officers were President, Mrs. B. Domagalewska, Secretary, Mrs. M. Kowalewska, and Treasurer, Mrs. M. Kasprzyk. the Rosary Society was established to honor and spread devotion to the Blessed Virgin Mary by reciting the rosary.

The Holy Name Society
The Holy Name Society was organized to promote the spiritual welfare of the men of the parish by encouraging and assisting them to participate the Confraternity of the Most Holy Name of Jesus. The Confraternity promotes the frequent reception of the Sacraments, the honoring of the Most Holy Name of Jesus by active religious life and the working against all things which offend the Most Holy Name of Jesus.

The Altar Society
On December 12, 1939, the Altar Society was organized under the direction of Father Ladislaus Krych. The society is in complete care of the altars, this includes providing linens, flowers at Christmas and Easter and other special occasions, candles and caring of the church laundry. Some of the member are assigned into groups and clean the Sanctuary and the Sacristy. The Patroness of the Altar Society is Our Lady of Perpetual Help.

The Felician Sisters Auxiliary
When the Mt. Carmel Parish acquired the teaching assistance of the Felician Sisters the ladies of the parish organized to aid the Felician Sisters Convent in Livonia. In 1939, under the leadership of Mrs. Veronica Michalak, Mrs. R. Wotta, Mrs. W. Patalon, Mrs. M. Kowalowska, and Mrs. R. Chojonowska, the Felician Sister's Auxiliary had its beginnings.

The Ushers Club
The Mt. Carmel Ushers Club was organized in 1939. For the past 65 years these men have assisted the pastors in the general maintenance of the parish property. They keep order in the church and take up the Sunday and Feast Day offerings at Mass. In order to perform their duties more effectively the Ushers have an official blazer to be worn at all church functions. Parishioners can easily recognize the navy blue blazer, white shirt, and grey slacks when assistance is needed in the church.

See also
Polish Cathedral style

External links

Roman Catholic churches completed in 1900
Churches in Wayne County, Michigan
Churches in the Roman Catholic Archdiocese of Detroit
Polish-American culture in Metro Detroit
Polish-American Roman Catholic parishes in the United States
Polish Cathedral style architecture
Wyandotte, Michigan
20th-century Roman Catholic church buildings in the United States